Valerie Clark is an American politician. She was a member of the Georgia House of Representatives from the 101st District, serving from 2013 to 2017. Clark represented the 104th district from 2011 to 2013. She is a member of the Republican party.

References

Republican Party members of the Georgia House of Representatives
21st-century American politicians
Living people
Year of birth missing (living people)
People from New York (state)